The Salado Creek AVA is an American Viticultural Area located in northern Stanislaus County, California, near the town of Patterson.  Most of the grapes grown in the AVA are made into wine by KitFox Vineyards, using a custom-crush facility in Lodi.

References 

American Viticultural Areas
American Viticultural Areas of California
Geography of Stanislaus County, California
2004 establishments in California